Rudolph Augustus (16 May 1627 – 26 January 1704), a member of the House of Welf, was Duke of Brunswick-Lüneburg and ruled as Prince of Brunswick-Wolfenbüttel from 1666 until his death. In 1685 he made his younger brother Anthony Ulrich co-ruler.

Life

He was born in Hitzacker, then the residence of his father Duke Augustus the Younger of Brunswick-Lüneburg and his second wife Princess Dorothea of Anhalt-Zerbst. His father assumed the rule in the Principality of Brunswick-Wolfenbüttel, after his Welf cousin Duke Frederick Ulrich had died childless in 1634.

Rudolph Augustus succeeded his father as ruling Prince of Brunswick-Wolfenbüttel in 1666. More interested in his studies and hunting, he soon after appointed his politically astute younger brother Anthony Ulrich governor. In 1671 both besieged and finally occupied the city of Braunschweig, ending about 250 years of local autonomy.

During his reign, Rudolph Augustus concentrated on the Baroque expansion of his ducal residence, including the Alter Weg ("Old Way"), a road connecting the cities of Brunswick and Wolfenbüttel. He died in 1704 at the Hedwigsburg hunting lodge.

Marriage and issue
In 1650 Rudolph Augustus married Christine Elizabeth (1634–1681), daughter of Count Albert Frederick of Barby and Mühlingen. They had three daughters:
 Dorothea Sophia (1653–1722), married Duke John Adolphus of Schleswig-Holstein-Sonderburg-Plön
 Christine Sophia (1654–1695), married her cousin Duke Augustus William of Brunswick-Lüneburg, the son of Duke Anthony Ulrich who succeeded his father as Prince of Brunswick-Wolfenbüttel in 1714.
 Eleonore Sophia (1655–1656), died in infancy.

Upon the death of his first wife, Rudolph Augustus entered into a morganatic marriage with Rosine Elisabeth Menthe (1663–1701), which remained childless.

Ancestry

References

External links

1627 births
1704 deaths
People from Hitzacker
Princes of Wolfenbüttel
New House of Brunswick
Burials at Brunswick Cathedral